Kanata North Ward or Ward 4 (French: Quartier Kanata-Nord) is a ward in the city of Ottawa, Ontario, Canada. The ward was created in 2006 when its predecessor, Kanata Ward, split in two main parts. The original Kanata Ward covered all of the former City of Kanata. The new Kanata North Ward also includes a small part taken from West Carleton Ward (near Palladium Drive)

Its represented on Ottawa City Council by Cathy Curry. She was appointed on November 20, 2021, replacing Jenna Sudds who was elected to Parliament in the 2021 Canadian federal election.

Communities in the ward include South March, Morgan's Grant, Kanata Lakes, Marchwood, Beaverbrook and Town Centre.

Following the 2020 Ottawa Ward boundary review, the ward will gain a small piece of territory in the South March area to accommodate a proposed housing development. 

Prior to its amalgamation into Ottawa, the City of Kanata had its own Kanata North Ward. It consisted of the city north of the Queensway.

Demographics
According to the Canada 2011 Census

Ethnic groups: 63.9% White, 11.7% Chinese, 7.9% South Asian, 3.6% Southeast Asian, 3.3% Black, 3.2% Arab, 1.6% West Asian, 1.2% Filipino, 1.0% Latin American 
Languages: 62.6% English, 9.9% Chinese, 6.9% French, 2.5% Arabic, 1.7% Russian, 1.5% Vietnamese, 1.4% Persian, 1.3% Urdu, 1.1% Spanish, 1.1% Punjabi  
Religions: 56.1% Christian (28.2% Catholic, 6.5% Anglican, 6.2% United Church, 2.6% Christian Orthodox, 1.6% Baptist, 1.4% Presbyterian, 1.1% Lutheran, 8.5% Other), 8.0% Muslim, 3.3% Hindu, 2.4% Buddhist, 2.8% Others, 27.4% No religion 
Median income (2010): $47,412 
Average income (2010): $56,001

Regional and city councillors
Prior to 1994, the area was represented by the Mayor of Kanata. Prior to 1978, the area was represented by the Reeve of March Township.

John Mlacak (1969-1976)
Marianne Wilkinson (1976-1985)
Des Adam (1985-1991)
Merle Nicholds (1991-1994)
Alex Munter (1994-2003)
Peggy Feltmate (2003-2006)
Marianne Wilkinson (2006–2018)
Jenna Sudds (2018–2021)
Cathy Curry (2021–present), appointed

Election results

1969 Ottawa-Carleton Regional Municipality elections

1972 Ottawa-Carleton Regional Municipality elections

1974 Ottawa-Carleton Regional Municipality elections

1976 Ottawa-Carleton Regional Municipality elections

1978 Ottawa-Carleton Regional Municipality elections

1980 Ottawa-Carleton Regional Municipality elections

1982 Ottawa-Carleton Regional Municipality elections

1985 Ottawa-Carleton Regional Municipality elections

1988 Ottawa-Carleton Regional Municipality elections

1991 Ottawa-Carleton Regional Municipality elections

1994 Ottawa-Carleton Regional Municipality elections

1997 Ottawa-Carleton Regional Municipality elections

2000 Ottawa municipal election

2003 Ottawa municipal election

2006 Ottawa municipal election

2010 Ottawa municipal election

2014 Ottawa municipal election

2018 Ottawa municipal election

2022 Ottawa municipal election

References

External links
 Map of Kanata North Ward

Ottawa wards